The Monastery of St. Rousanou is an Eastern Orthodox monastery that is part of the Meteora monastery complex in Thessaly, central Greece. It is situated at the top of a rocky precipice.

To the southeast of Rousanou Monastery, the Psaropetra Viewpoint is located by the side of a main road.

References

Rousanou